Jonathan Myles Gardiner Willatt (born 8 July 1961) is an English former first-class cricketer.

The son of the cricketer Guy Willatt, he was born at Kendal in July 1961. He was educated at Repton School, before going up St Catharine's College, Cambridge. While studying at Cambridge, he played first-class cricket for Cambridge University Cricket Club in 1989, making five appearances. Playing as an opening batsman in the Cambridge side, we scored 172 runs at an average of 13.23, with a highest score of 45.

References

External links

1961 births
Living people
Sportspeople from Kendal
Cricketers from Cumbria
People educated at Repton School
Alumni of Trinity College, Cambridge
English cricketers
Cambridge University cricketers